Noy Alooshe (born 13 August 1979) is an Israeli journalist and musician. His family is of Tunisian-Jewish descent. Best known outside Israel for his Zenga Zenga spoof song on Muammar Gaddafi. He lives in Tel Aviv and is a member of the Israeli techno group Hovevey Zion ("Lovers of Zion"), best known for its hit song "Rotze Banot" ("I Want Girls"), a Hebrew remix of the Swedish dance song "Boten Anna."

As a result of his success from the video "Zenga Zenga", Alooshe shared that he received many commercial offers: "These days are crazy because advertisers are calling me and wanting me to do productions for them; music companies want to sell the song on iTunes." In 2011, he said he had also received antisemitic death threats, though he was not too concerned since "at the moment they remain on the Internet."

Apart from Zenga Zenga, his by far best known work, he also spoofed Benjamin Netanyahu's speech to the United States Congress to the tune of "We No Speak Americano" as "Bi Bi pro Americano". He also wrote Dvir Bar's song "Livni Boy," one of Israel's first political YouTube hits. Alooshe worked for Tzipi Livni's Hatnuah campaign in 2013.

References

External links 

Israeli DJs
Israeli Mizrahi Jews
Israeli people of Tunisian-Jewish descent
Living people
Israeli Sephardi Jews
1979 births